Wayne Walton (born October 15, 1948) is a former American football tackle and guard. He played for the New York Giants in 1971 and for the Kansas City Chiefs from 1973 to 1974.

References

1948 births
Living people
Sportspeople from Waco, Texas
Players of American football from Texas
American football tackles
American football guards
Abilene Christian Wildcats football players
New York Giants players
Kansas City Chiefs players